Doddy may refer to:

Doddy Édouard (born 1981), Mauritian footballer
Doddy Gray (1880–1961), New Zealand rugby union player
Doddy!, television show by English comedian Ken Dodd

See also

Dod (nickname), includes Doddie
Dody, given name